James Jarrett Lankas (August 26, 1918 – August 9, 1978) was an American football player in the National Football League. His position was fullback.

Biography
Lankas was born on August 26, 1918 in Stratton, Nebraska.

Career
Lankas was a member of the Philadelphia Eagles during the 1942 NFL season. The following season, he played with the Green Bay Packers.

He played at the collegiate level at St. Mary's College of California.

See also
List of Philadelphia Eagles players
List of Green Bay Packers players

References

1918 births
1978 deaths
Players of American football from Nebraska
Philadelphia Eagles players
Green Bay Packers players
Saint Mary's Gaels football players
People from Hitchcock County, Nebraska